Lilly Scholz, married name Gaillard, (born 18 April 1903; date of death unknown) was an Austrian pair skater. Competing in partnership with Otto Kaiser, she became the 1928 Olympic silver medalist and 1929 World champion. The pair won the bronze medal at Worlds in 1925 and silver from 1926 through 1928. Scholz later competed with Willy Petter and won three European medals.

Results

With Willy Petter

With Otto Kaiser

References 
 Skatabase: 1920s Worlds results
 Skatabase: 1920s Olympics results

External links 

 Database Olympics profile

Navigation 

1903 births
Austrian female pair skaters
Figure skaters at the 1928 Winter Olympics
Olympic silver medalists for Austria
Olympic figure skaters of Austria
Year of death missing
Olympic medalists in figure skating
World Figure Skating Championships medalists
European Figure Skating Championships medalists
Medalists at the 1928 Winter Olympics